The Americas Zone was the unique zone within Group 3 of the regional Davis Cup competition in 2021. The zone's competition was held in round robin format in Panama City, Panama, from 30 June to 3 July 2021.

Participating nations

Inactive nations

Draw 
Date: 30 June–3 July 2021

Location: Centro de Alto Rendimiento Fred Maduro, Panama City, Panama (clay)

Format: Round-robin basis. Two pools of four teams and one pool of three teams. Nations finishing top of their group, as well as the best second-placed nation, will play-off for promotion to the World Group II Play-offs in 2022.

Seeding 

 1Davis Cup Rankings as of 8 March 2021

Round Robin

Pool A

Pool B

Pool C 

Standings are determined by: 1. number of wins; 2. number of matches; 3. in two-team ties, head-to-head records; 4. in three-team ties, (a) percentage of sets won (head-to-head records if two teams remain tied), then (b) percentage of games won (head-to-head records if two teams remain tied), then (c) Davis Cup rankings.

Second-placed nation standings 
The best second placed nation will be determined the following way (in the order set out below):
 The nation with the greatest number of points
 The nation with the highest percentage of matches won to total matches played.
 The nation with the highest percentage of sets won to total sets played.
 The nation with the highest percentage of games won to total games played.

For the two nations competing in the groups of four (Groups B & C), the results of the ties against the team that finishes in fourth place in those groups will not be included in the above calculations.

Playoffs 

  and  qualify for the 2022 Davis Cup World Group II Play-offs

Round Robin

Pool A

Cuba vs. Bahamas

Guatemala vs. Cuba

Guatemala vs. Bahamas

Pool B

Costa Rica vs. Trinidad and Tobago

Honduras vs. Bermuda

Costa Rica vs. Honduras

Bermuda vs. Trinidad and Tobago

Costa Rica vs. Bermuda

Honduras vs. Trinidad and Tobago

Pool C

Jamaica vs. U.S. Virgin Islands

Puerto Rico vs. Panama

Jamaica vs. Panama

Puerto Rico vs. U.S. Virgin Islands

Jamaica vs. Puerto Rico

Panama vs. U.S. Virgin Islands

Play-offs

Promotional play-offs

Costa Rica vs. Guatemala

Bahamas vs. Jamaica

5th to 6th play-offs

Bermuda vs. Puerto Rico

7th to 8th play-offs

Cuba vs. Honduras

9th to 10th play-offs

Panama vs. Trinidad and Tobago

References

External links 
 Official Website

Davis Cup Americas Zone
Americas Zone